Marie of Valois may refer to:
Marie of Valois, Duchess of Calabria (1309–1332), the eldest daughter of Charles of Valois to his third wife Mahaut of Châtillon.
Marie of France, Duchess of Bar (1344–1404), or Marie of Valois, the sixth child and second daughter of John II of France and Bonne of Bohemia
Marie of Valois, Prioress of Poissy (1393–1438), daughter of Charles VI of France and Isabeau of Bavaria
Marie de Valois (1444–1473), natural daughter of Charles VII of France

See also 
Mary of France (disambiguation)